Live in Tokyo is a live album by pianist Barry Harris which was recorded in Japan in 1976 and released on the Xanadu label.

Reception

The Allmusic review awarded the album 4½ stars stating "Although not containing any real surprises, this swinging, straight-ahead music is quite enjoyable".

Track listing 
All compositions by Barry Harris except as indicated
 "A Soft Spot" - 5:46   
 "Round Midnight" (Thelonious Monk) - 5:58   
 "Tea for Two" (Vincent Youmans, Irving Caesar) - 4:45   
 "Dance of the Infidels" (Bud Powell) - 5:43   
 "I'll Remember April" (Gene de Paul, Patricia Johnston, Don Raye) - 8:39   
 Dedication in Japanese - 1:15   
 "Fukai Aijoh" - 4:09   
 "Un Poco Loco" (Powell) - 6:14

Personnel 
Barry Harris - piano
Sam Jones - bass
Leroy Williams - drums

References 

Barry Harris live albums
1976 live albums
Xanadu Records live albums
Albums produced by Don Schlitten